The Accademia di Architettura di Mendrisio (AAM) is a Swiss school of architecture and is a founding unit of Università della Svizzera italiana (USI).

History 
The Accademia was founded by Mario Botta, whose influences were Kenneth Frampton, Snozzi and Lio Gallfetti.

Notable faculty

Present  
 Mario Botta
 Valerio Olgiati
 Diébédo Francis Kéré
 Jun'ya Ishigami
 Riccardo Blumer (Director)

Former 
 Francesco Dal Co
 Kenneth Frampton
 Harald Szeeman
 Elia Zenghelis
 Peter Zumthor
 Aurelio Galfetti
 Eduardo Souto de Moura
 Bijoy Jain

References

External links 
Accademia di Architettura di Mendrisio website

Architecture schools in Switzerland
Mendrisio
Schools in the canton of Ticino
University of Lugano